Indus Sagar Doab (Punjabi) is the tract of land in Punjab, Pakistan, lying between the Indus River and the Jhelum River. It is one of the five major doabs of the Punjab and forms the north western portion of the Punjab plain.

Districts 
It covers Attock District, Rawalpindi District, Jhelum District, Chakwal District, Mianwali District, Khushab District, Bhakkar District, Layyah District, Muzaffargarh District and Athara Hazari Tehsil and Ahmadpur Sial Tehsil of Jhang District..

Major areas in this doab include the Kala Chitta Range, Margalla and Murti Hills, Pothohar Plateau, Salt Range and Thal Desert.

Some major cities of this doab are Rawalpindi, Taxila, Attock, Chakwal, Jhelum, Pind Dadan Khan, Talagang, Mianwali, Bhakkar, Layyah, Muzaffargarh, Khushab and Quaidabad.

Of the Punjab doabs, the Indus Sagar Doab is the largest in land area, but the poorest for agriculture, due to the presence of the Salt Range and Thal Desert.

Doab 
The word doab is of Persian origin, signifying the region between two rivers. According to Shaikh Abu'l-Fazl ibn Mubarak, the grand vizier of the Mughal emperor Akbar, and author of the Akbarnama, the names of the doabs were decided by Akbar.

See also
 Rachna Doab
 Chaj Doab
 Bari Doab

References

Doabs of Punjab, Pakistan
Geography of Punjab, Pakistan
Punjab
Punjab, Pakistan
Regions of Punjab, Pakistan